Kožuchov is a village and municipality in the Trebišov District in the Košice Region of south-eastern Slovakia.

History
In historical records the village was first mentioned in 1330.

Geography
The village lies at an altitude of 110 metres and covers an area of 5.868 km2.
It has a population of about 235 people.

Ethnicity
The village is about 98% Slovak.

Facilities
The village has a public library and a football pitch.

Genealogical resources

The records for genealogical research are available at the state archive "Statny Archiv in Kosice, Slovakia"

 Roman Catholic church records (births/marriages/deaths): 1755-1917 (parish B)

See also
 List of municipalities and towns in Slovakia

External links
https://web.archive.org/web/20090621123522/http://www.statistics.sk/mosmis/eng/run.html
Surnames of living people in Kozuchov

Villages and municipalities in Trebišov District
Zemplín (region)